Mounds State Park is a state park near Anderson, Madison County, Indiana featuring Native American heritage, and ten ceremonial mounds built by the prehistoric Adena culture indigenous peoples of eastern North America, and also used centuries later by Hopewell culture inhabitants. It is separate from (and about 79 miles northwest of) the similarly named Mounds State Recreation Area (near Brookville, Franklin County, Indiana). The park receives about 400,000 visitors annually.

The park is 1 of 14 Indiana State Parks that are in the path of totality for the 2024 solar eclipse, with the park having 3 minutes and 45 seconds of totality.

Mounds

The largest earthwork, the "Great Mound", is believed to have been constructed around 160 BCE. The Great Mound is a circular earth enclosure with an internal ditch and south to southwest entrance. One particular mound at the Anderson Site has a sequence of clay platforms, each deliberately covered by a layer of ash.

Earthworks
The term earthworks includes any structure made from the earth. In Native American studies, there are three primary types: mounds, circular enclosures, and complexes. All are found in Central Indiana and in the state park. Mounds State Park has a complex of enclosures, both circular and rectangular. There are seven enclosures and four additional earthworks, which have been divided into two groups, the northern complex and the southern complex. The "Great Mound" enclosure is the dominant structure in the park and the southern group.

Great Mound
The central mound was excavated in 1968/69 and found to have three clay layers, each with ashes, showing a succession of use periods.
The complex has been dated to 160 BCE through 50 CE These dates are obtained through radiocarbon dating and some artifacts. A nearby log tomb was found with a platform pipe typical of Hopewell styles from 50 C.E. Post hole remnants were dated to 60 BCE and 230 CE. Radiocarbon dates from excavated material of the Great Mound established 160 BCE +/- 90 for the embankment. The neighboring ‘’Fiddleback" Mound was dated to 120 BCE +/- 70.

Notable features

In 1900, a series of strange misshapen skeletons were unearthed from similar mounds in nearby Alexandria, Indiana. This brought thousands of tourists from around the Mid-West. In 1910, several locals admitted to stealing chimpanzee skeletons from the nearby Muncie Zoo's monkey house. In 1915 the skeletons were sold to a local museum which burned down in 1919.

What is now Mounds State Park was the location of an amusement park that operated from 1897 until 1929. While the amusement park exploited the native-made mounds, it also helped to protect them by making them a "point of regional pride and a destination"; otherwise they might have been plundered or otherwise destroyed. When the Great Depression hit, the property was sold to the Madison County Historical Society, which transferred ownership to the State of Indiana, after which it became Mounds State Park.

Canoeing is also available in Mounds State Park, on the White River.

See also
 Adena culture
 Hopewell tradition
 List of Hopewell sites
 List of burial mounds in the United States
 List of archaeological sites on the National Register of Historic Places in Indiana
 List of Indiana state parks

References

External links

Official Mounds State Park website
Central States Archaeological Societies: Mounds State Park
National Register of Historic Places for Madison County, Indiana

Mounds in Indiana
State parks of Indiana
Anderson, Indiana
Hopewellian peoples
Native American history of Indiana
160s BC establishments
2nd-century BC establishments in the Adena culture
Archaeological sites on the National Register of Historic Places in Indiana
National Register of Historic Places in Madison County, Indiana
Protected areas of Madison County, Indiana
Protected areas established in 1973
1973 establishments in Indiana
Nature centers in Indiana
Tourist attractions in Anderson, Indiana
Parks on the National Register of Historic Places in Indiana